Hernando Navarrete (born 28 April 1916) was a Colombian long-distance runner. He competed in the men's 5000 metres at the 1936 Summer Olympics.

References

External links
 

1916 births
Year of death missing
Athletes (track and field) at the 1936 Summer Olympics
Colombian male long-distance runners
Olympic athletes of Colombia
Place of birth missing